David H. Uible, (born December 14, 1960) is a rancher, investor, and former Republican Party Chairman and County Commissioner.

Early life and education
Uible was born and raised in Cincinnati, Ohio, the youngest of nine children of Richard and Verna Uible. After graduating from Sycamore High School he went on to Purdue University in West Lafayette, Indiana where he graduated in 1983 with a B.S. in Mechanical Engineering. Uible also did graduate work at Xavier University and graduated from the Executive Management Program at the University of Cincinnati.

Personal life 
In 1985, Uible married Cindy Cassell, a college classmate from Purdue University. They have a child. The Uible family lives on the  Vista Grand Ranch of New Richmond, Ohio where they raise American Buffalo for their USDA meat label.

Career
Uible's first position in the international division of a computer software company led to starting his first company, Rosegate Technology Group, in 1989 to sell reconditioned computer equipment to Swiss banks. In 1993, Uible privatized the medical publishing division of the Russian Ministry of Health (former USSR). This initiative opened advertising opportunities for western pharmaceuticals, and sales grew from $0 to $6 million before the company was re-nationalized by the Russian government in May 1996.

In 1995, Uible co-founded the Cincinnati Chapter of Young Entrepreneurs Organization (now known as Entrepreneurs' Organization). He also served as the Chapter's President.

Uible has been a member of the Clermont County Planning Commission, the Northern Kentucky University School of Entrepreneurship, the Southern Ohio Agricultural Community Development Fund, the University Club of Cincinnati, and the Cincinnati Youth Collaborative.

Uible has been a Director of the New Richmond National Bank, Treasurer of the Clermont County Republican Central and Executive Committees, and Advisory Judge of Purdue University Center of Entrepreneurship.

Since 2012 Uible was one of three board member on the Investment Advisory Committee for Clermont County, which manages about $100,000,000 in municipal and corporate bonds and U.S. Treasury investments.

From May 2014 thru May 2018 Uible was elected and served as Party Chairman of the Clermont County Republican Party.

Since 1989, Uible has started, acquired, and sold companies in the IT, publishing, and manufacturing industries.

Board of Clermont County Commissioners 
After a county commissioner seat was vacated in March 2012, Uible was appointed to the Board of Clermont County Commissioners with 67% of the Clermont County Republican Central Committee vote on March 14, 2012, from a field of ten candidates seeking the appointment. Uible went on to win the general election in November 2012 defeating his Democratic opponent, Len Harding, 67.54% to 32.46. With endorsements from Senator Portman, Governor Kasich, and Representative Wenstrup, Uible was reelected for a second term in November 2014 after winning 74.34% of the vote over his Democratic opponent Richard Perry.

Controversies 
In 2017, Uible lobbied to have the professional soccer team FC Cincinnati build their $30M practice complex in Clermont County.  The effort was orchestrated by Uible through the Clermont County Convention and Visitor's Bureau (CVB).  In August 2018 the Clermont County Board of County Commissioners approved a 1% lodging tax designed to bring the new soccer facility to Clermont County. In September 2018 FC Cincinnati began building their new complex in Milford, Ohio. Officials said they expect to get $2 back for every $1 they spend. Formerly, Uible served as both a Clermont County commissioner and as a member of the county's visitors bureau. The Ohio Attorney General issued an opinion that said that service on a county convention and visitors bureau by a county commissioner was a conflict of interest. Uible had left the visitors bureau prior to the opinion being issued.

In 2019 Uible pleaded guilty to tampering with records, a misdemeanor offense, as it related to his candidate petition. The former Clermont County Commissioner was sentenced to a 90-day probation and fined $250.

Uible ran in the Republican Primary in 2020 for the Ohio Senate District 14 seat against Terry Johnson. Uible received the endorsement from the Clermont County Republican Party, however the State Republican Senate Caucus campaign for Johnson. Two weeks before the election a state Republican central committee member filed for an investigation accusing Uible of forging the Republican voter guide, which resulted in newspaper stories and media headlines. The Clermont County prosecutor refused to prosecute Uible, however the State Attorney General got a grand jury to indicted Uible on charges including forgery, fraud, falsification and tampering. The case was tried before Clermont County Common Pleas Judge McBride who wrote in his decision on December 8, 2021   that the State of Ohio failed to show where any of the alleged crimes took place, one critical element that must be established beyond a reasonable doubt for any conviction. Because the venue requirement was never met the court would not address the charges of tampering with evidence and falsification. Additionally, Judge McBride stated that the State presented insufficient evidence that Uible committed forgery, since the voter guide Uible was accused of printing was downloaded from the Republican Party's website where the Party encourage its members to copy and share it with colleagues, family members and friends. Regarding the fraud charge, Judge McBride wrote that there was no evidence that Uible caused some detriment to another and he certainly received no financial gain. In conclusion, Judge McBride acquitted Uible of all ten charges in the indictment.

References

External links 
https://web.archive.org/web/20130413233244/http://bcc.clermontcountyohio.gov/davidhuible.aspx (Official Clermont County Government Website)
http://uibleforohio.com/ (Campaign Website)

1960 births
County commissioners in Ohio
Living people
Politicians from Cincinnati